The Mercedes-Benz T80 was a six-wheeled vehicle built by Mercedes-Benz, developed and designed by Ferdinand Porsche. It was intended to break the world land speed record, but never made the attempt, the project having been overtaken by the outbreak of World War II.

Background 
World-renowned German auto racer Hans Stuck's pet project was to take the world land speed record and he convinced Mercedes-Benz to build a special racing car for the attempt. Officially supported by Adolf Hitler (a race car fan influenced by Stuck), the project was started in 1937. By late 1939, when the project was finished, the target speed was a much higher . This would also be the first attempt at the absolute land speed record on German soil, Hitler envisioned the T80 as another propaganda triumph of German technological superiority to be witnessed by all the world, courtesy of German television.[Verification needed] The same Autobahn course had already been proven ideal for record-breaking in smaller capacity classes, Britain's Goldie Gardner having exceeded  there in a 1,500 cc MG.

Power 
The massive 44.5 litre Daimler-Benz DB 603 inverted V12 was selected to power the record-setting car. The engine was an increased displacement derivative of the famous DB-601 aircraft engine that powered the Messerschmitt Bf 109 fighter in production at the time, with the DB 603 ending up as the largest displacement inverted V12 aviation engine in production for Germany during the World War II years. The engine ran on a special mixture of methyl alcohol (63%), benzene (16%), ethanol (12%), acetone (4.4%), nitrobenzene (2.2%), avgas (2%), and ether (0.4%) with MW (methanol-water) injection for charge cooling and as an anti-detonant.

Construction 
The difficulty of the challenge was met with money and engineering genius. By 1939, the T80 was fully completed at a cost of RM 600,000. Aerodynamically, the T80 incorporated a Porsche-designed enclosed cockpit, low sloping bonnet, rounded wings, and elongated tail booms. Midway down the body were two small wings to provide downforce and ensure stability - these wings were inspired by the wings of Opel's famous rocket cars from 1928. The heavily streamlined twin-tailed body (forming the fairings for each pair of tandem rear wheels) achieved a drag coefficient of 0.18, an astonishingly low figure for any vehicle.

Projections for the 1940 land speed record attempt 
The date was set for the January 1940 "RekordWoche" (Record Week), but the war begun on September 1, 1939 prevented the T80 run. In 1939, the vehicle had been unofficially nicknamed Schwarzer Vogel (Black Bird) by Hitler and was to be painted in German nationalistic colours, complete with German eagle and Nazi swastika, but the event was cancelled and the T80 garaged.

War and after the war 
The DB 603 aircraft engine was subsequently removed during the war while the vehicle was moved to safety and storage in Kärnten, Austria. The T80 survived the war and was eventually moved into the Mercedes-Benz Museum in Stuttgart for permanent display.

Current status 
The T80 is currently on display at the Mercedes-Benz Museum in Stuttgart-Bad Cannstatt.

Technical data 
Total weight: 
Power:  at 3200 rpm
Engine: 
Wheels: (6) 7 X 31
Length: 
Width (body without wings): 
Width (body with wings): 
Height: 
Drag Coefficient: 0.18
Speed: estimated at between

Names of the T80 
Official: Mercedes-Benz T80
Porsche: Mercedes Rekordwagen (Record Car)
Mikcl: Hochgeschwindigkeitsrennwagen (High-speed racing car)
Hitler: Schwarzer Vogel (Black Bird)

See also 
 Daimler-Benz DB 603

References

External links 

Mercedes-Benz T 80 record car, 1939, website "mercedes-benz-classic.com"
Official Mercedes-Benz Museum website
Speed record attempts, lists cars that attempted to break the land speed record from 1934 to 1940, including the T80.
Museum tour of the Mercedes-Benz Museum at official website of European Car.
Old Machine Press Page on the Mercedes-Benz T80

Wheel-driven land speed record cars
T80
Cars powered by aircraft engines